Kim Hyun-woo (born 14 August 1979) is a South Korean journalist. He is a SBS political reporter and SBS Eight O'Clock News's main weekday anchor.

He was considered the youngest main news anchor among South Korean terrestrial broadcasters.

Biography
Kim Hyun-woo studied Japanese studies at Hankuk University of Foreign Studies after graduating from high school.

He joined SBS as a reporter in 2005 and assumed various posts in the division since. He became SBS' political reporter in 2016 after becoming its economics reporter in 2013.

Personal life
He is married to fellow SBS announcer, Lee Yeo-jin on 15 December 2019, at a hotel in Seoul. The couple welcomed their first child together, a son, on 22 August 2020.

Career

As reporter
 2005–2008 : SBS Social division reporter
 2008–2012 : SBS Sports division reporter
 2013–2016 : SBS Economic reporter
 2016–present: SBS Political reporter

As news anchor
 2012–2014: Morning Wide weekend anchor
 2014–16 December 2016: Morning Wide main weekday anchor
 19 December 2016 – 21 May 2017: SBS 8 News weekend anchor
 22 May 2017–present: SBS 8 News weekday anchor

References

1979 births
Living people
South Korean television presenters
South Korean journalists
Hankuk University of Foreign Studies alumni
People from Seoul
Seoul Broadcasting System people